Bartłomiej Paweł Stój (pronounced ; born 15 May 1996) is a Polish athlete specialising in the discus throw. He won a gold medal at the 2015 European Junior Championships in Eskilstuna.

His personal best in the event is 64.64 metres set in Bydgoszcz in 2016.

International competitions

1No mark in the final

References

1996 births
Living people
Polish male discus throwers
World Athletics Championships athletes for Poland
People from Nisko County
Competitors at the 2017 Summer Universiade
Competitors at the 2019 Summer Universiade
Athletes (track and field) at the 2020 Summer Olympics
Olympic athletes of Poland